Immeya was a king of Ebla, in modern Syria, reigning around 1750–1725 BCE.

Reign
Immeya was most likely buried in the so-called "Tomb of the Lord of the Goats", in the royal necropolis of the western palace at Ebla, as suggested by a silver cup found here, bearing an inscription in his name. Assuming that, it is likely that the funerary equipment found in the tomb belonged to Immeya too. This included some objects in carved hippopotamus ivory, the remains of a throne decorated with bronze goat heads, and especially an ancient Egyptian ceremonial mace made of gold, silver and ivory, a gift from the 13th Dynasty pharaoh Hotepibre, who was a contemporary of Immeya.

Immeya also appears as the sender of a letter to a ruler, which was also found at Ebla. One of his successors—not necessarily the direct one—was a certain king Hammu[...], whose full name was probably Hammurabi.

As with other rulers of the third kingdom of Ebla, Immeya's name is Amorite; furthermore, it seems that "Immeya" was a hypocorism.

Sources

Kings of Ebla
18th-century BC monarchs
18th-century BC people